Tanag Lai (also Romanized as Tanag Lā’ī and Tanak Lā’ī) is a village in Chelo Rural District, Chelo District, Andika County, Khuzestan Province, Iran. At the 2006 census, its population was 56, in 8 families.

References 

Populated places in Andika County